Clemens von Wedemeyer born (1974 Göttingen, Germany) is a German video artist.

He studied fine arts at the Academy of Visual Arts Leipzig, with Astrid Klein. In 2004 von Wedemeyer produced, together with Maya Schweizer, a documentary movie: Metropolis, Report from China which was finished in 2006. In 2008, he was a resident at the University of California, Santa Barbara. He lives and works in Berlin and Leipzig, Germany.

Awards
2002 VG Bildkunst Award for Experimental Film and Video–art, Munich Film Festival, Germany
2002 Marion Ermer Prize, Leipzig
2005 Kunstpreis der Böttcherstrasse in Bremen, Germany
2006 Kurzfilmtage Oberhausen
2008 Villa Romana prize

Exhibitions
2016 P.O.V., Neuer Berliner Kunstverein, Germany (solo)
2015 Muster, MCA Screen, Museum of Contemporary Art, Chicago, US (solo)
2014 Every Word You Say, Kunstverein Braunschweig, Germany (solo)
2013 MAXXI – National Museum of the 21st Century Arts, Rome (solo)
2013 Bergen Assembly, Norway
2012 documenta (13), Kassel, Germany
2011 Metropolis, Report from China, Frankfurter Kunstverein, Frankfurt am Main, Germany (solo)
2010 Sun Cinema, Mardin, Turkey (public art project)
2009 Curve Commission, Barbican Arts Centre, London
2007 Skulptur Projekte Münster, Germany
2006 PS1 MoMA, New York City (solo)
2005 1st Moscow Biennale, Russia

References

External links
An Interview with Clemens von Wedemeyer by Bert Rebhandl
"Clemens von Wedemeyer", Art in America, 4/26/10, Koch Oberhuber Wolff, Sabine Russ
"Clemens von Wedemeyer", frieze, June–August 2006
 Exhibition in 2011
 Clemens von Wedemeyer's profile at Kadist Art Foundation

German video artists
1974 births
Artists from Göttingen
Living people